Qaleh-ye Hajji Shafi (also Romanized as Qal‘eh-ye Ḩājjī Shafī‘; also known as Chahār Cheshmeh and Qal‘eh-ye Ḩājj Shafī‘) is a village in Chahar Cheshmeh Rural District, Kamareh District, Khomeyn County, Markazi Province, Iran. At the 2006 census, its population was 31, in 12 families.

References 

Populated places in Khomeyn County